Ukr, ukr, or UKR may be:

ukr, ISO 639-2 code for the Ukrainian language
UKR, country code for Ukraine for several types of country codes
UKR, IATA code for Mukeiras Airport

See also
.укр